Dark Tower 2 may refer to:

The Dark Tower II: The Drawing of the Three, the 1987 sequel to the 1982 novel The Dark Tower: Gunslinger
Return to Dark Tower, the upcoming sequel to the 1981 board game Dark Tower